Thomas W. Smiles was an English professional footballer who played as an inside forward in the Football League for York City, and in non-League football for 19th Regiment.

References

Year of birth missing
Year of death missing
English footballers
Association football forwards
York City F.C. players
English Football League players